Urine is a liquid by-product of metabolism in humans and in many other animals. Urine flows from the kidneys through the ureters to the urinary bladder. Urination results in urine being excreted from the body through the urethra.

Cellular metabolism generates many by-products that are rich in nitrogen and must be cleared from the bloodstream, such as urea, uric acid, and creatinine. These by-products are expelled from the body during urination, which is the primary method for excreting water-soluble chemicals from the body. A urinalysis can detect nitrogenous wastes of the mammalian body.

Urine plays an important role in the earth's nitrogen cycle. In balanced ecosystems, urine fertilizes the soil and thus helps plants to grow. Therefore, urine can be used as a fertilizer. Some animals use it to mark their territories. Historically, aged or fermented urine (known as lant) was also used for gunpowder production, household cleaning, tanning of leather and dyeing of textiles.

Human urine and feces are collectively referred to as human waste or human excreta, and are managed via sanitation systems. Livestock urine and feces also require proper management if the livestock population density is high.

Physiology

Most animals have excretory systems for elimination of soluble toxic wastes. In humans, soluble wastes are excreted primarily by the urinary system and, to a lesser extent in terms of urea, removed by perspiration. The urinary system consists of the kidneys, ureters, urinary bladder, and urethra. The system produces urine by a process of filtration, reabsorption, and tubular secretion. The kidneys extract the soluble wastes from the bloodstream, as well as excess water, sugars, and a variety of other compounds. The resulting urine contains high concentrations of urea and other substances, including toxins. Urine flows from the kidneys through the ureter, bladder, and finally the urethra before passing from the body.

Duration 
Research looking at the duration of urination in a range of mammal species found that nine larger species urinated for 21 ± 13 seconds irrespective of body size. Smaller species, including rodents and bats, cannot produce steady streams of urine and instead urinate with a series of drops.

Characteristics

Quantity
Producing too much or too little urine needs medical attention. Polyuria is a condition of excessive production of urine (> 2.5 L/day), oliguria when < 400 mL are produced, and anuria being < 100 mL per day.

Constituents

About 91–96% of urine consists of water. The remainder can be broadly characterized into inorganic salts, urea, organic compounds, and organic ammonium salts. Urine also contains proteins, hormones, and a wide range of metabolites, varying by what is introduced into the body.

Urea is the largest constituent of the solids, constituting more than 50% of the total. The daily volume and composition of urine varies per person based on the amount of physical exertion, environmental conditions, as well as water, salt, and protein intakes. In healthy persons, urine contains very little protein and an excess is suggestive of illness, as with sugar. Organic matter, in healthy persons, also is reported to at most 1.7 times more matter than minerals. However, any more than that is suggestive of illness.

However, it is important to note that lesser amounts and concentrations of other compounds and ions are often present in urination of humans.

Color

Urine varies in appearance, depending principally upon a body's level of hydration, interactions with drugs, compounds and pigments or dyes found in food, or diseases. Normally, urine is a transparent solution ranging from colorless to amber, but is usually a pale yellow. Usually urination color comes primarily from the presence of urobilin. Urobilin is a final waste product resulting from the breakdown of heme from hemoglobin during the destruction of aging blood cells.

Colorless urine indicates over-hydration. Colorless urine in drug tests can suggest an attempt to avoid detection of illicit drugs in the bloodstream through over-hydration.

 Dark yellow urine is often indicative of dehydration.
 Yellowing may be caused by removal of excess riboflavin from the bloodstream.
 Certain medications such as rifampin and phenazopyridine can cause orange urine.
 Bloody urine is termed hematuria, a symptom of a wide variety of medical conditions.
 Dark orange to brown urine can be a symptom of jaundice, rhabdomyolysis, or Gilbert's syndrome.
 Black or dark-colored urine is referred to as melanuria and may be caused by a melanoma or non-melanin acute intermittent porphyria.
 Pinkish urine can result from the consumption of beets (beeturia)
 Greenish urine can result from the consumption of asparagus or foods, beverages with green pigments, or from a urinary tract infection.
 Reddish or brown urine may be caused by porphyria (not to be confused with the harmless, temporary pink or reddish tint caused by beeturia).
 Blue urine can be caused by the ingestion of methylene blue (e.g., in medications) or foods or beverages with blue dyes.
 Blue urine stains can be caused by blue diaper syndrome.
 Purple urine may be due to purple urine bag syndrome.

Odor
Sometime after leaving the body, urine may acquire a strong "fish-like" odor because of contamination with bacteria that break down urea into ammonia. This odor is not present in fresh urine of healthy individuals; its presence may be a sign of a urinary tract infection.

The odor of normal human urine can reflect what has been consumed or specific diseases. For example, an individual with diabetes mellitus may present a sweetened urine odor. This can be due to kidney diseases as well, such as kidney stones. Additionally, the presence of amino acids in urine (diagnosed as maple syrup urine disease) can cause it to smell of maple syrup.

Eating asparagus can cause a strong odor reminiscent of the vegetable caused by the body's breakdown of asparagusic acid. Likewise consumption of saffron, alcohol, coffee, tuna fish, and onion can result in telltale scents. Particularly spicy foods can have a similar effect, as their compounds pass through the kidneys without being fully broken down before exiting the body.

pH
The pH normally is within the range of 5.5 to 7 with an average of 6.2. In persons with hyperuricosuria, acidic urine can contribute to the formation of stones of uric acid in the kidneys, ureters, or bladder. Urine pH can be monitored by a physician or at home.

A diet which is high in protein from meat and dairy, as well as alcohol consumption can reduce urine pH, whilst potassium and organic acids, such as from diets high in fruit and vegetables, can increase the pH and make it more alkaline.

Cranberries, popularly thought to decrease the pH of urine, have actually been shown not to acidify urine. Drugs that can decrease urine pH include ammonium chloride, chlorothiazide diuretics, and methenamine mandelate.

Density 
Human urine has a specific gravity of 1.003–1.035.

Bacteria and pathogens 
Urine is not sterile, not even in the bladder. In the urethra, epithelial cells lining the urethra are colonized by facultatively anaerobic Gram-negative rod and cocci bacteria. One study conducted found total of 116 bacterial isolates were found in 77 healthy humans (ages 5–11) and 39 cows, a considerable amount being pathogens. Pathogens identified and their percentages were:

The study also states:

Examination for medical purposes

Many physicians in ancient history resorted to the inspection and examination of the urine of their patients. Hermogenes wrote about the color and other attributes of urine as indicators of certain diseases. Abdul Malik Ibn Habib of Andalusia ( 862 AD) mentions numerous reports of urine examination throughout the Umayyad empire. Diabetes mellitus got its name because the urine is plentiful and sweet. The name uroscopy refers to any visual examination of the urine, including microscopy, although it often refers to the aforementioned prescientific or Proto-scientific forms of urine examination. Clinical urine tests today duly note the color, turbidity, and odor of urine but also include urinalysis, which chemically analyzes the urine and quantifies its constituents. A culture of the urine is performed when a urinary tract infection is suspected, as bacteriuria without symptoms doesn't require treatment. A microscopic examination of the urine may be helpful to identify organic or inorganic substrates and help in the diagnosis.

The color and volume of urine can be reliable indicators of hydration level. Clear and copious urine is generally a sign of adequate hydration. Dark urine is a sign of dehydration. The exception occurs when diuretics are consumed, in which case urine can be clear and copious and the person still be dehydrated.

Uses

Source of medications
Urine contains proteins and other substances that are useful for medical therapy and are ingredients in many prescription drugs (e.g., Ureacin, Urecholine, Urowave). Urine from postmenopausal women is rich in gonadotropins that can yield follicle stimulating hormone and luteinizing hormone for fertility therapy. One such commercial product is Pergonal.

Urine from pregnant women contains enough human chorionic gonadotropins for commercial extraction and purification to produce hCG medication. Pregnant mare urine is the source of estrogens, namely Premarin. Urine also contains antibodies, which can be used in diagnostic antibody tests for a range of pathogens, including HIV-1.

Urine can also be used to produce urokinase, which is used clinically as a thrombolytic agent.

Fertilizer

Cleaning
Given that urea in urine breaks down into ammonia, urine has been used for cleaning. In pre-industrial times, urine was used – in the form of lant or aged urine – as a cleaning fluid. Urine was also used for whitening teeth in Ancient Rome.

Gunpowder

Urine was used before the development of a chemical industry in the manufacture of gunpowder. Urine, a nitrogen source, was used to moisten straw or other organic material, which was kept moist and allowed to rot for several months to over a year. The resulting salts were washed from the heap with water, which was evaporated to allow collection of crude saltpeter crystals, that were usually refined before being used in making gunpowder.

Survival uses

The US Army Field Manual advises  drinking urine for survival. The manual explains that drinking urine tends to worsen rather than relieve dehydration due to the salts in it, and that urine should not be consumed in a survival situation, even when there is no other fluid available. In hot weather survival situations, where other sources of water are not available, soaking cloth (a shirt for example) in urine and putting it on the head can help cool the body.

During World War I, Germans experimented with numerous poisonous gases as weapons. After the first German chlorine gas attacks, Allied troops were supplied with masks of cotton pads that had been soaked in urine. It was believed that the ammonia in the pad neutralized the chlorine. These pads were held over the face until the soldiers could escape from the poisonous fumes.

Urban legend states that urine works well against jellyfish stings. This scenario has appeared many times in popular culture including in the Friends episode "The One With the Jellyfish", an early episode of Survivor, as well as the films The Real Cancun (2003), The Heartbreak Kid (2007) and The Paperboy (2012). However, at best it is ineffective, and in some cases this treatment may make the injury worse.

Textiles
Urine has often been used as a mordant to help prepare textiles, especially wool, for dyeing. In the Scottish Highlands and Hebrides, the process of "waulking" (fulling) woven wool is preceded by soaking in urine, preferably infantile.

Animal repellent
The urine of predator species is often used as a repellent against their prey species. Urine plays a role in interspecific communication, since it contains semiochemicals that can act as kairomones.

History

The fermentation of urine by bacteria produces a solution of ammonia; hence fermented urine was used in Classical Antiquity to wash cloth and clothing, to remove hair from hides in preparation for tanning, to serve as a mordant in dying cloth, and to remove rust from iron. Ancient Romans used fermented human urine (in the form of lant) to cleanse grease stains from clothing. The emperor Nero instituted a tax on the urine industry, continued by his successor, Vespasian. The Latin saying  ('money doesn't smell') is attributed to Vespasian – said to have been his reply to a complaint from his son about the unpleasant nature of the tax. Vespasian's name is still attached to public urinals in France, Italy, and Romania.

Alchemists spent much time trying to extract gold from urine, which led to discoveries such as white phosphorus by German alchemist Hennig Brand when distilling fermented urine in 1669. In 1773 the French chemist Hilaire Rouelle discovered the organic compound urea by boiling urine dry.

Language 
The English word urine comes from the Latin  (-ae, f.), which is cognate with ancient words in various Indo-European languages that concern water, liquid, diving, rain, and urination (for example Sanskrit  meaning 'it rains' or  meaning 'water' and Greek  meaning 'to urinate'). The onomatopoetic term piss predates the word urine, but is now considered vulgar. Urinate was at first used mostly in medical contexts. Piss is also used in such colloquialisms as to piss off, piss poor, and the slang expression pissing down to mean heavy rain. Euphemisms and expressions used between parents and children (such as wee, pee, and many others) have long existed.

Lant is a word for aged urine, originating from the Old English word  referring to urine in general.

See also
 Drinking urine (urophagia)
 Ureotelic
 Urine therapy
 Urolagnia, an attraction to urine

Notes

References

External links

 Urinanalysis  at the University of Utah Eccles Health Sciences Library
 Urine Chemistry at drugs.com

Animal physiology
Body fluids
Sanitation